MICDS (Mary Institute and Saint Louis Country Day School) is a secular, co-educational, independent school home to more than 1,250 students ranging from grades Junior Kindergarten through 12.  Its  campus is located in the St. Louis suburb of Ladue.

Each of the school's three divisions operate somewhat independently as a “school within a school”. The Lower School, also referred to as The Ronald S. Beasley School, or “Beasley” for short, is for students in grades junior kindergarten through 4. The MICDS Middle School, grades 5 to 8, is in the former Mary Institute facilities. The Upper School on the former Country Day School campus serves grades 9 through 12.

History

William Greenleaf Eliot, founder and chancellor of Washington University in St. Louis, established predecessor institutions to MICDS in the 1850s as part of the university. A boys' school, Smith Academy, was founded in 1854, and was later attended by Eliot's grandson, the future poet T. S. Eliot.

A sister school for girls, Mary Institute, was founded in 1859 and was named for Eliot's late daughter Mary Rhodes Eliot, who had died at 17. In its early years, Mary Institute moved twice within the city of St. Louis; its third building, at the corner of Lake and Waterman, is now New City School.

Smith Academy closed in June 1917, in part due to the proliferation of private elementary schools and public secondary schools in the area. Three months later, St. Louis Country Day School opened in northwestern St. Louis County. Inspired by the Country Day School movement nationally, it was not related to Smith, although a number of former Smith students enrolled that first year. St. Louis Country Day School's campus was in a bucolic setting reached by electric streetcar, far removed from the noise and grit of the city.

Mary Institute moved to its Ladue campus in 1931 and became independent of Washington University in 1949. The Mary Institute building contains a three-figure bronze sculpture by Cyrus Dallin: Alma Mater, honoring schoolmaster Edmund Hamilton Sears and donated by Eliza Northrop McMillan. By the 1950s, the tranquility of the Country Day campus was disrupted by the growth of the adjacent Lambert–Saint Louis International Airport. St. Louis Country Day School moved to a new campus next to Mary Institute in Ladue in 1958, and eventually sold its old campus to the airport.

Eliot's grandson, Nobel laureate T. S. Eliot, who attended Mary Institute's kindergarten and Smith Academy, spoke at Mary Institute's centennial in 1959. Although various connections, including theatrical cooperation, had existed between Mary Institute and St. Louis Country Day School for years, academic coordination between Mary Institute and Country Day began during the 1970s and culminated in the 1992 merger of the schools.

St. Louis Country Day headmaster John Johnson, who coordinated the merger, became head of the combined schools. The school observed its sesquicentennial during a celebration that ran from May 11, 2009, to May 11, 2010.

In 2013, MICDS opened a STEM building on the Upper School campus that contained classrooms, an auditorium, a hearth room, and student commons. The space also contains conference rooms, a faculty office space and work center, a robotics garage, and a science lab for independent research. The building is certified as LEED Platinum.

Athletics
MICDS teams have won 32 state championships and 41 district championships.

The school has one of the few high school cycling teams in St. Louis. They competed in the Tour De St. Louis in 2009; two MICDS riders finished with the peloton.

MICDS has an athletic rivalry with the nearby John Burroughs School. MICDS observes its Homecoming on the weekend when all the teams play Burroughs; there is a traditional bonfire and pep rally to inspire team spirit. MICDS also has a cross-state rivalry with The Pembroke Hill School in Kansas City.

Pro Football Hall of Fame inductee Marv Levy began his coaching career here in 1951, staying for two years.

The women's varsity field hockey team won the Midwest Championships in 2013, 2014, and 2015.

Men's water polo finished third in state in 2014.

The Men's lacrosse team has won eight state championships, including six straight championships since 2014 under head coach Andy Kay.

Athletic facilities 

In 2016, MICDS began construction on the O'Hara field and stadium, which replaced Ellis Field. It is used for football, lacrosse, and soccer. The same year, MICDS also began construction on The Steward Family Aquatic Center, which features a pool with a bulkhead in the center, allowing two teams to practice at the same time. The pool is also longer and the lanes are wider. It is also deep enough to allow the diving team to practice on campus.

In 2011, a donor offered to fund the construction of an ice hockey arena, but the city of Ladue rejected the proposal and the arena was never built. The team practices off campus.

Notable alumni

Business
Morton May, Chairman, May Department Stores
John McDonnell, Chairman, McDonnell-Douglas Corporation
William F. Ruprecht, CEO, Sotheby's Auction House
George Herbert Walker IV, Chairman and CEO of Neuberger Berman

Government and Politics
John Danforth, U.S. Senator and Episcopal priest
Thomas Eagleton, U.S. Senator and Democratic Nominee for Vice President of the United States
William McChesney Martin, Jr., Federal Reserve Bank chairman
Mark McCloskey, attorney and U.S. Senate candidate
James W. Symington, U.S. Congressional Representative
Pete Wilson, Mayor of San Diego, U.S. Senator and Governor of California
Alan Webber, Mayor of Santa Fe, New Mexico

Sports and Entertainment
Drew Baur, Owner, St. Louis Cardinals
Graham Bensinger, sports broadcaster 
Sterling K. Brown, actor
Joe Buck, sports broadcaster
Dwight F. Davis, founder of the Davis Cup international tennis competition and U.S. Secretary of War (attended CDS precursor Smith Academy)
William DeWitt, Jr., owner, St. Louis Cardinals
Betty Grable (attended, did not graduate), actress and World War II pin-up girl
Jim Lee, comic book artist 
Robby McGehee, 1999 Indianapolis 500 Rookie of the Year
Vincent Price, actor
Devon Windsor, model
Michael Scherer, football coach at University of Nevada, Las Vegas

Arts, Sciences, and Education
William S. Barker, president of Covenant Theological Seminary (St. Louis), 1977–1984
Sally Benson, author of Meet Me in St. Louis and Junior Miss
Louis Daniel Brodsky, poet
Edmond La Beaume Cherbonnier, professor and scholar of religious studies
Winston Churchill (novelist), author of Richard Carvel, The Crisis (novel), and The Crossing (Churchill novel), among others.
William Henry Danforth, chancellor, Washington University in St. Louis
T.S. Eliot, poet (attended CDS precursor Smith Academy)
Peg Fenwick, screenwriter and playwright
Irving Fisher, economist, statistician, inventor, and Progressive social campaigner (attended CDS precursor Smith Academy)
Landon Jones, editor and author  
Shepherd Mead, author, How to Succeed in Business Without Really Trying
Nick Reding, journalist and author of Methland: The Death and Life of an American Small Town
Hadley Richardson, first wife of Ernest Hemingway
Irma S. Rombauer, author of Joy of Cooking
Frederick Seidel, poet
Peter Taylor, short-story writer and novelist
Sara Teasdale, poet
Harry Weber (sculptor), Sculptor
Linda Wells, founder and editor-in-chief, Allure magazine; annual guest judge on the Bravo reality television series Shear Genius
Sterling K. Brown, Actor “This Is Us (television), Black Panther (movie) Marshall (movie)”

References

External links
 Mary Institute and St. Louis Country Day School

Elementary schools in St. Louis County, Missouri
Middle schools in St. Louis County, Missouri
High schools in St. Louis County, Missouri
Private K-12 schools in Missouri
Private schools in St. Louis County, Missouri
Educational institutions established in 1859
Private high schools in Missouri
Private middle schools in Missouri
Private elementary schools in Missouri
1859 establishments in Missouri
Leadership in Energy and Environmental Design platinum certified buildings